Brian Wilfred Hewat (1894 –  28 February 1970) was a New Zealand barrister and politician who served as the mayor of Invercargill from 1950 to 1953.

Biography 
Hewat was born in Oamaru in 1894. He attended Waitaki Boys' High School and the University of Otago, where he achieved a Bachelor of Laws. During World War I he served with the Otago Mounted Rifles Regiment in Gallipoli and France. After the war, he started a law practice in Invercargill and married Brenda Humphries in 1920. He served one term on the Invercargill City Council from 1933 to 1935. During World War II, he was commander of the Invercargill Battalion of the Home Guard.

In 1950, Hewat intended to challenge incumbent mayor William Aitchison, who had been serving since the death of Abraham Wachner in August. However, Aitchison withdrew his nomination on 7 November and Hewat was elected mayor unopposed. He ran for re-election in the 1953 mayoral election, but was defeated by councillor Adam Adamson.

Hewat died in Invercargill on 28 February 1970 and is buried in the St John's Cemetery.

References

1894 births
1970 deaths
People from Oamaru
People educated at Waitaki Boys' High School
University of Otago alumni
New Zealand military personnel of World War I
New Zealand military personnel of World War II
20th-century New Zealand lawyers
Invercargill City Councillors
Mayors of Invercargill
Burials at St John's Cemetery, Invercargill